"Honeymoon Feelin'" is a single by American country music artist Roy Clark. Released in February 1974, it was the first single from his album Roy Clark / The Entertainer. The song peaked at number 4 on the Billboard Hot Country Singles chart. It also reached number 1 on the RPM Country Tracks chart in Canada.

Chart performance

References

1974 singles
Roy Clark songs
1974 songs
Dot Records singles
Song recordings produced by Joe Allison
Songs written by Ron Hellard
Songs written by Gary S. Paxton